Bancolombia S.A. (also known as Grupo Bancolombia; formerly: Banco de Colombia) is a full-service financial institution that provides financial products and services in Colombia, Panama, El Salvador, Puerto Rico, the Cayman Islands, Peru and Guatemala. Bancolombia is one of the six banking-related companies of the COLCAP index. The Bank operates in nine segments: Banking Colombia, Banking El Salvador, Leasing, Trust, Investment, Brokerage, Off Shore, Pension and Insurance, and all other segments.

Together with its subsidiaries, the Bank provides a range products and services, including savings and investment products, financing, mortgage banking, factoring, financial and operating leases, treasury, comprehensive cash management, foreign currency, insurance, brokerage services, investment banking, asset management and trust services. As of December 31, 2018, the Bank's consolidated branch network consisted of 1041 offices.

History 
Bancolombia was founded on January 29, 1875 as "Banco de Colombia" in Medellín, Colombia. In 1929 the bank began trading on the Bolsa de Bogotá. In 1995 the bank became the first Colombian company to trade on the New York Stock Exchange.

In 1998 "Banco de Colombia" and "Banco Central Colombiano (BIC)" are consolidated, born in this way Bancolombia.

In 2005 Bancolmbia fuses with "Conavi" and "Corfinsura" to create "Grupo Bancolombia".

In 2021 Bancolombia renews it's corporative image, along with all entities that conform the "Grupo Bancolombia".

References

External links

 

Companies listed on the New York Stock Exchange
Banks of Colombia
Companies listed on the Colombia Stock Exchange
Companies based in Medellín
Banks established in 1945
Colombian brands
1945 establishments in Colombia